"Oh! Wot a Dream" was a Kevin Ayers single taken from his fourth solo album Bananamour. Ayers has stated in interviews that 'Oh! Wot A Dream' was about his friend and colleague Syd Barrett – "You are the most extraordinary person / You write the most peculiar kind of tunes / I met you floating as I was boating / One Afternoon".  'Connie On A Rubber Band' was a non album track that would later be included on 1976 compilation Odd Ditties.

Track listing

"Oh! Wot A Dream" (Kevin Ayers)
"Connie On A Rubber Band" (Kevin Ayers)

Personnel
Kevin Ayers / Guitar, Vocals
Eddie Sparrow / Percussion

Notes

Kevin Ayers songs
1972 singles
Songs written by Kevin Ayers
1972 songs
Harvest Records singles
Songs about Syd Barrett